Broadway Rose is a 1922 American silent romantic drama film released by Metro Pictures and directed by Robert Z. Leonard. It stars Leonard's then-wife Mae Murray and Monte Blue. The film is based on an original story by Edmund Goulding written for star Murray, and was produced by Leonard's and Murray's production company Tiffany Pictures.

Cast
 Mae Murray as Rosalie Lawrence
 Monte Blue as Tom Darcy
 Raymond Bloomer as Hugh Thompson
 Ward Crane as Reggie Whitley
 Alma Tell as Barbara Royce
 Charles Lane as Peter Thompson
 Maude Turner Gordon as Mrs. Peter Thompson
 Jane Jennings as Mrs. Lawrence
 Pauline Dempsey as Maid

Preservation
Prints of Broadway Rose are maintained  at the George Eastman House and Gosfilmofond in Moscow.

References

External links

Broadway Rose posters

1922 films
1922 romantic drama films
American romantic drama films
American silent feature films
American black-and-white films
Films directed by Robert Z. Leonard
Tiffany Pictures films
Metro Pictures films
1920s American films
Silent romantic drama films
Silent American drama films